Anita O'Day Swings Cole Porter with Billy May is a 1959 studio album by Anita O'Day, of songs written by Cole Porter arranged by Billy May.

O'Day and May recorded another album dedicated to a single composer, Richard Rodgers, in 1960.

Track listing 
 "Just One of Those Things" – 2:05
 "Love for Sale" – 2:42
 "You'd Be So Nice to Come Home To" – 1:48
 "Easy to Love" – 2:01
 "I Get a Kick Out of You" – 2:21
 "All of You" – 1:40
 "Get Out of Town" – 2:28
 "I've Got You Under My Skin" – 1:47
 "Night and Day" – 1:59
 "It's De-Lovely" – 2:03
 "I Love You" – 1:56
 "What Is This Thing Called Love?" – 2:30
CD bonus tracks
"You're the Top" – 2:24
"My Heart Belongs to Daddy" – 2:51
 "Why Shouldn't I?" – 3:06
 "From This Moment On" – 3:09
 "Love for Sale" – 3:34
 "Just One of Those Things" – 2:38

All songs written by Cole Porter.

Personnel 
 Anita O'Day – vocals
 Billy May – arranger, conductor

References 

1959 albums
Anita O'Day albums
Albums arranged by Billy May
Albums produced by Norman Granz
Verve Records albums
Cole Porter tribute albums
Albums conducted by Billy May